Bazex–Dupré–Christol syndrome is a very rare condition inherited in an X-linked dominant fashion. Physical findings typically include follicular atrophoderma, multiple basal cell carcinomas, hypotrichosis, and hypohidrosis.

Genetics 

BCDS is inherited in an X-linked dominant manner. This means the defective gene responsible for the disorder is located on the X chromosome, and only one copy of the defective gene is sufficient to cause the disorder when inherited from a parent who has the disorder. Males are normally hemizygous for the X chromosome, having only one copy. As a result, X-linked dominant disorders usually show higher expressivity in males than females.

As the X chromosome is one of the sex chromosomes (the other being the Y chromosome), X-linked
inheritance is determined by the sex of the parent carrying a specific gene and can often seem complex. This is because, typically, females have two copies of the X-chromosome, while males have only one copy. The difference between dominant and recessive inheritance patterns also plays a role in determining the chances of a child inheriting an X-linked disorder from their parentage.A locus of Xq24-q27 has been described.

Diagnosis
Genetic testing of x linked dominant pattern associated with various neoplasm nnn (e.g. basal cell carcinoma)

Treatment

See also 
 Crouzon syndrome
 List of cutaneous conditions
 List of cutaneous neoplasms associated with systemic syndromes

References

External links 

Genodermatoses
X-linked dominant disorders
Genetic disorders with OMIM but no gene
Syndromes with tumors